Jonathon Daniel Amaya (born November 25, 1988) is a former American football safety. He was signed by the Miami Dolphins as an undrafted free agent in 2010 and also played for the New Orleans Saints. He played college football at Nevada.

Professional career

Miami Dolphins
He was signed as an undrafted free agent by the Dolphins on April 30, 2010, but was cut during training camp and added to the practice squad. On October 30, he was signed to the active roster. He made 10 appearances, recording 15 tackles on special teams.

New Orleans Saints
On July 28, 2011, he was traded to the New Orleans Saints in the Reggie Bush trade. He appeared in all 16 games for the Saints, recording 14 tackles and a forced fumble.

Second stint with the Miami Dolphins
On September 25, 2012, Amaya returned to the Miami Dolphins.

Arizona Cardinals
On March 27, 2013, Amaya signed a one-year deal with the Arizona Cardinals. He was released on August 30, 2013

Kansas City Chiefs
Amaya was signed by the Kansas City Chiefs on August 11, 2014. He was released on August 30, 2014.

Personal life
In November 2012, Amaya was arrested in Miami Beach for allegedly assaulting a cab driver following an argument. On January 11, 2013, Miami-Dade prosecutors notified the court that they would not proceed with the case. The charge of battery was dropped, clearing Amaya's name.
Amaya had maintained his innocence the entire time.

References

External links
Miami Dolphins bio
New Orleans Saints bio

1988 births
Living people
People from Diamond Bar, California
Players of American football from California
Sportspeople from Los Angeles County, California
American football safeties
Nevada Wolf Pack football players
Miami Dolphins players
New Orleans Saints players
Arizona Cardinals players
Kansas City Chiefs players